Regisaurus ("Rex's lizard", named after its discoverer Francis Rex Parrington) is an extinct genus of small carnivorous therocephalian. It is known from a single described species, the type species Regisaurus jacobi, from the Early Triassic Lystrosaurus Assemblage Zone of South Africa, although at least one undescribed species is also known.

Description
 
It was a rather derived baurioid, with a robust skull, short tail, long limbs and relatively large canines. It was apparently related to Urumchia and like Urumchia, it had vomer bones, which form the secondary palate, but they do not narrow to a tip like in Urumchia. However, it retained some primitive characteristics. It had six incisor teeth in each side of the jaw, whereas other baurioids had less. It was probably carnivorous, and ate insects and small vertebrates

Discovery and species
Regisaurus was discovered in 1964 by Francis Rex Parrington and it was named in 1972 by C. H. Mendrez. Two species are known, the type species Regisaurus jacobi and an additional undescribed species. R. jacobi is known from the holotype FRP 1964/27 and the referred specimen BP/1/3973, while the undescribed species is known only from the Holotype T837.

Classification
Below is a cladogram modified from Sidor (2001) and Huttenlocker (2009):

See also
 List of therapsids

References

Lopingian synapsids of Africa
Baurioids
Fossil taxa described in 1972
Lopingian genus first appearances
Changhsingian genera
Induan genera
Early Triassic genus extinctions